Arthur E. Arling, A.S.C. (September 19, 1906 – October 16, 1991) was a Hollywood cameraman and cinematographer. His early work included 1939's Gone with the Wind and 1946's The Yearling, for which he won a joint Oscar which he shared with Charles Rosher and Leonard Smith. He was nominated for an Oscar for the 1955 Lillian Roth biopic I'll Cry Tomorrow. Arling, a Lieutenant Commander in the United States Navy during World War II, is buried at Riverside National Cemetery in Riverside, California.

Partial filmography

 The Yearling (1946)
 The Homestretch (1947)
 Captain from Castile (1947)
 Mother Is a Freshman (1949)
 You're My Everything (1949)
 My Blue Heaven (1950)
 Wabash Avenue (1950)
 Call Me Mister (1951)
 Belles on Their Toes (1952)
 Red Garters (1954)
 Love Me or Leave Me (1955)
 I'll Cry Tomorrow (1955)
 Three for the Show (1955)
 The Glass Slipper (1955)
 Ransom! (1955)
 The Great American Pastime (1956)
 Man in the Shadow (1957)
 Tammy and the Bachelor (1957)
 Flood Tide (1957)
 Pay the Devil (1958)
 This Happy Feeling (1958)
 Once Upon a Horse (1958)
 Kathy O' (1958)
 The Story of Ruth (1959)
 Pillow Talk (1959)
 Take a Giant Step (1959)
 Lover Come Back (1961)
 Swingin' Along (1961)
 Boys' Night Out (1962)
 The Notorious Landlady (1962)
 My Six Loves (1963)
 Strait-Jacket (1964)
 The Secret Invasion (1964)
 Once Before I Die (1965)
 Ski Party (1965)

References

External links

Allmovie bio

1906 births
1991 deaths
Burials at Riverside National Cemetery
American cinematographers
Best Cinematographer Academy Award winners